Kamen is a surname of Bulgarian origin meaning "stone". Adopted in most slavic countries. Notable people with the surname include:

Dean L. Kamen (born 1951), American inventor and businessman
Henry Kamen, British historian
Jack Kamen, American illustrator
Martin Kamen, scientist
Michael Arnold Kamen (1948–2003), American composer
Nick Kamen (1962–2021), English model and singer
Robert Mark Kamen, American screenwriter and producer

See also
Kaman (surname)

Czech-language surnames